Hugo Sheridan Sims Jr. (October 14, 1921 – July 9, 2004) was a U.S. Representative from South Carolina.

Early life

Born in Orangeburg, South Carolina, Sims attended the public schools.  He graduated from Wofford College, Spartanburg, South Carolina in 1941.  After graduation, he was editor of the Times and Democrat, the daily newspaper of Orangeburg from 1941 to 1942.

He served in the United States Army from 1942 to 1945, commanding Company A, 501st Parachute Infantry, 101st Airborne Division, while serving in the Second World War.  During his service, he was awarded the Distinguished Service Cross and Silver Star.

After the war, he graduated from the law school of the University of South Carolina in 1947 and was a lawyer in private practice.

Political career

He served as member of the South Carolina House of Representatives from 1947 to 1948.  He then defeated incumbent John J. Riley for the Democratic nomination to Congress from the Second District.  He was elected to the Eighty-first Congress.  However, he lost the Democratic nomination to Riley in 1950, who went on to regain the Congressional seat.

Later life

Sims reentered the United States Army in 1951, and then resumed the practice of law from 1951 to 1965.  He served as president of the Management and Investment Corporation from 1965 to 1983.

He died on July 9, 2004, in Orangeburg, South Carolina, and is interred in Memorial Park Cemetery in Orangeburg.

Sources

External links 
 

1921 births
2004 deaths
Wofford College alumni
University of South Carolina alumni
United States Army officers
Democratic Party members of the United States House of Representatives from South Carolina
20th-century American politicians
United States Army personnel of World War II